Tirathaba ruptilinea is a species of moth of the family Pyralidae. It was described by Francis Walker in 1866. It is found in Australia and South East Asia.

References 

Tirathabini
Moths described in 1866